Mike Barbarick (born 1 August 1959) is a retired American soccer goalkeeper who played professionally in the North American Soccer League, American Soccer League, United Soccer League and American Indoor Soccer Association.

Barbarick attended the University of Washington, playing on the men's soccer team from 1977 to 1980. In 1981, he signed with the Seattle Sounders of the North American Soccer League and played one game during the 1981-1982 NASL indoor season and was voted second star of the game. He began the 1982 outdoor season with the Sounders before being traded to the San Diego Sockers during the season. He was nominated by Ron Neuman for NASL Rookie of the Year in 1982. In 1983, he played for the Pennsylvania Stoners of the American Soccer League. In 1984, he played for the Houston Dynamos of the United Soccer League. He led the American Indoor Soccer Association with the lowest goals against average and greatest number of victories during the 1984-1985 season.

References

External links
NASL stats

American soccer players
American Indoor Soccer Association players
American Soccer League (1933–1983) players
Canton Invaders players
Houston Dynamos players
North American Soccer League (1968–1984) indoor players
North American Soccer League (1968–1984) players
Pennsylvania Stoners players
San Diego Sockers (NASL) players
Seattle Sounders (1974–1983) players
United Soccer League (1984–85) players
Washington Huskies men's soccer players
Soccer players from Pennsylvania
People from Darby, Pennsylvania
1959 births
Living people
Association football goalkeepers
Sportspeople from Delaware County, Pennsylvania